A perovskite solar cell (PSC) is a type of solar cell that includes a perovskite-structured compound, most commonly a hybrid organic–inorganic lead or tin halide-based material as the light-harvesting active layer. Perovskite materials, such as methylammonium lead halides and all-inorganic caesium lead halide, are cheap to produce and simple to manufacture.

Efficiencies of laboratory-scale devices using these materials have increased from 3.8% in 2009 to 25.7% in 2021 in single-junction architectures, and, in silicon-based tandem cells, to 29.8%, exceeding the maximum efficiency achieved in single-junction silicon solar cells. Perovskite solar cells have therefore been the fastest-advancing solar technology .  With the potential of achieving even higher efficiencies and very low production costs, perovskite solar cells have become commercially attractive. Core problems and research subjects include their short- and long-term stability.

Advantages
The raw materials used and the possible fabrication methods (such as various printing techniques) are both low cost. Their high absorption coefficient enables ultrathin films of around 500 nm to absorb the complete visible solar spectrum. These features combined result in the ability to create low cost, high efficiency, thin, lightweight, and flexible solar modules. Perovskite solar cells have found use in powering prototypes of low-power wireless electronics for ambient-powered Internet of things applications, and may help mitigate climate change.

Perovskite cells also possess many optoelectrical properties that benefit their use in solar cells. For example, the exciton binding energy is small. This allows electron holes and electrons to be easily separated upon the absorption of a photon. Moreover, the long diffusion distance of the charge carrier and the high diffusivity - the rate of diffusion - allow the charge carriers to travel long distances within the perovskite solar cell, which improves the chance of it to be absorbed and converted to power. Lastly, perovskite cells are characterized by wide absorption ranges and high absorption coefficients, which further increase the power efficiency of the solar cell by increasing the range of photon energies that are absorbed

Materials 

The name "perovskite solar cell" is derived from the ABX3 crystal structure of the absorber materials, referred to as perovskite structure, where A and B are cations and X is an anion. A cations with radii between 1.60 Å and 2.50 Å have been found to form perovskite structures. The most commonly studied perovskite absorber is methylammonium lead trihalide (CH3NH3PbX3, where X is a halogen ion such as iodide, bromide, or chloride), which has an optical bandgap between ~1.55 and 2.3 eV, depending on halide content. Formamidinium lead trihalide (H2NCHNH2PbX3) has also shown promise, with bandgaps between 1.48 and 2.2 eV. Its minimum bandgap is closer to the optimal for a single-junction cell than methylammonium lead trihalide, so it should be capable of higher efficiencies. The first use of perovskite in a solid-state solar cell was in a dye-sensitized cell using CsSnI3 as a p-type hole transport layer and absorber. A common concern is the inclusion of lead as a component of perovskite materials; solar cells composed from tin-based perovskite absorbers such as CH3NH3SnI3 have also been reported, though with lower power-conversion efficiencies.

Shockley-Queisser limit 
Solar cell efficiency is limited by the Shockley–Queisser limit. This calculated limit sets the maximum theoretical efficiency of a solar cell using a single junction with no other loss aside from radiative recombination in the solar cell. Based on the AM1.5G global solar spectra, the maximum power conversion efficiency is correlated to a respective bandgap, forming a parabolic relationship.

This limit is described by the equation

Where

and u is the ultimate efficiency factor, and v is the ratio of open circuit voltage Vop to band-gap voltage Vg, and m is the impedance matching factor, and Vc is the thermal voltage, and Vs is the voltage equivalent of the temperature of the Sun.

The most efficient bandgap is found to be at 1.34 eV, with a maximum power conversion efficiency (PCE) of 33.7%. Reaching this ideal bandgap energy can be difficult, but utilizing tunable perovskite solar cells allows for the flexibility to match this value. Further experimenting with multi-junction solar cells allow for the Shockley-Queisser limit to be surpassed, expanding to allow photons of a broader wavelength range to be absorbed and converted, without increasing thermalization loss.

The actual band gap for formamidinium (FA) lead trihalide can be tuned as low as 1.48 eV, which is closer to the ideal bandgap energy of 1.34 eV for maximum power-conversion efficiency single junction solar cells, predicted by the Shockley Queisser Limit. The 1.3 eV bandgap energy has been successfully achieved with the  hybrid cell, which has a tunable bandgap energy (Eg) from 1.24 – 1.41 eV

Multi-junction solar cells 
Multi-junction solar cells are capable of a higher power conversion efficiency (PCE), increasing the threshold beyond the thermodynamic maximum set by the Shockley–Queissier limit for single junction cells. By having multiple bandgaps in a single cell, it prevents the loss of photons above or below the band gap energy of a single junction solar cell. In tandem (double) junction solar cells, PCE of 31.1% has been recorded, increasing to 37.9% for triple junction and 38.8% for quadruple junction solar cells. However, the metal organic chemical vapor deposition (MOCVD) process needed to synthesize lattice-matched and crystalline solar cells with more than one junction is very expensive, making it a less than ideal candidate for widespread use.

Perovskite semiconductors offer an option that has the potential to rival the efficiency of multi-junction solar cells but can be synthesized under more common conditions at a greatly reduced cost. Rivalling the double, triple, and quadruple junction solar cells mentioned above, are all-perovskite tandem cells with a max PCE of 31.9%, all-perovskite triple-junction cell reaching 33.1%, and the perovskite-Si triple-junction cell, reaching an efficiency of 35.3%. These multi-junction perovskite solar cells, in addition to being available for cost-effective synthesis, also maintain high PCE under varying weather extremes – making them utilizable worldwide.

Chiral ligands 
Utilizing organic chiral ligands shows promise for increasing the maximum power conversion efficiency for halide perovskite solar cells. Chirality can be produced in inorganic semiconductors by enantiomeric distortions near the surface of the lattice, electronic coupling between the substrate and a chiral ligand, assembly into a chiral secondary structure, or chiral surface defects. By attaching a chiral phenylethylamine ligand to an achiral lead bromide perovskite nanoplatelet, a chiral inorganic-organic perovskite is formed. Inspection of the inorganic-organic perovskite via circular dichroism (CD) spectroscopy, reveals two wavelength regions that were assigned to the charge transfer between the ligand and the nanoplatelet (300-350 nm) and the excitonic absorption in the perovskite. Evidence of charge transfer in these systems shows promise for increasing the power conversion efficiency.

Inorganic perovskites 

The highest performing perovskites solar cells suffer from chemical instability. The organic components such as methylammonium or formamidinium  are the basis of the weakness. Encapsulation to prevent this decay is expensive. Fully inorganic perovskites, which have PCE over 17%, could minimize these problems. These cells are created using CsPbI3, which has a band gap similar to that of high-performing OIHPs (~1.7 eV), as well as excellent optoelectrical properties. Although chemically stable, these perovskite materials face significant issues with phase stability that prevent its broad industrial application. In high efficiency CsPbI3, for example, the photoactive black α-phase is prone to transform into the inactive yellow δ-phase seriously inhibiting the performance, especially when exposed to moisture. The challenge of stabilizing the photoactive black α-phase of inorganic perovskite materials has been tackled in a variety of strategies, including octahedral anchoring and secondary crystal growth.

2D Hybrid organic-inorganic perovskites 
2D perovskites are characterized by improved stability and excitonic confinement properties compared with 3D perovskites, while maintaining the charge transport properties of 3D perovskite materials. Furthermore, the 2D hybrid organic-inorganic perovskite (HOIP) structure also eases the steric restrictions on the “B” cations, as outlined by the Goldschmidt’s tolerance factor in 3D HOIPs, providing a much larger compositional space to engineer new materials with tailored properties.

Structure 
HOIPs follow the same ABX3 stoichiometry as their 3D counterparts. In this case, B is a metal cation, X is halogen anions (Cl−, Br−, I−) and A represents an organic molecular cation. The A-site cations are caged in a BX6 corner-sharing octahedra network via the hydrogen bond of N-H-X between the ammonium group from the A-site cation and the halogen from octahedra. As the length of the 2D organic ion increases, the spacing between the corner sharing octahedra does as well, forming a 2D or quasi-2D structure. The organic and inorganic layers are held together by van der Waals forces. A formula of R2An−1BnX3n+1 is used to characterize the 2D and quasi 2D structures. Here, R is the large organic cation space that separates the inorganic layers and n refers to the number of organic units between inorganic layers.

Mechanical properties 
To achieve mechanically durable devices, a top priority is to understand the inherent mechanical properties of the materials. Like other 2D materials, mechanical properties are analyzed using computational methods and are verified using experiments.

Nanoindentation is a common technique to measure mechanical properties of 2D materials. Nanoindentation results in 2D HOIP reveal anisotropy in the Young’s modulus along different plane directions (100, 001, and 110). Gao et al. showed single-crystal (C6H5CH2NH3)2PbCl4 had mid-range anisotropy in these directions because of corner sharing inherent to the crystal structure. The strongest direction was the [100] direction which is perpendicular to the inorganic layers. Generally, across many 2D HOIPs, there is a dominant correlation between increased Pb-X (very common cation) bond strength and Young’s moduli. Similarly, another nanoindentation study found that changing the A ion from organic CH3NH3+ to inorganic Cs+ has negligible effects on the Young’s modulus, whereas the Pb–X strength has the dominating effect. Due to the increased mechanical stability of the inorganic layers, nanoindentation finds that 2D HOIP structures with thicker and more densely packed inorganic layers have increased Young’s moduli and increased stability.

A study by Tu et al. performed mechanical properties testing on a simple lead iodide system to investigate the role of the number and the length of subunits (organic layer) on the out of plane Young’s modulus utilizing nanoindentation. This study found that 2D HOIPs are softer than 3D counterparts due to a shift from covalent/ionic bonding to van der Waals bonding. Furthermore, increasing the number of subunits “n” from (1-5) increases the Young’s modulus and hardness until reaching 3D standard values. The length of the organic chain decreases and plateau’s the Young’s modulus. These factors can be tailored when designing perovskites solar cells for unique applications.

2D HOIP are also susceptible to the negative Poisson's ratio phenomena, in which a material contracts laterally with stretching and expands laterally when compressed. This phenomena is observed commonly in 2D materials and the Poisson's ratio can be modulated by changing the “X” halide in the 2D HOIP chemistry. Halides with weaker electronegativity form weaker bonds with the “B” cation resulting in increased (in magnitude) negative Poisson ratio. This leaver allows for tunable flexibility of 2D HOIPs and applications of microelectromechanical and nanoelectronics devices.

2D/3D hybrid perovskites
3D perovskite cells have shown poor environmental stability and are decomposed by water, light and heat. To stabilize them, researchers such as Krishna et al. have investigated developing  lower dimension perovskites such as 2D cells. These cells are characterized by alternating organic and inorganic layers also known as Ruddelson-Popper (RP) phases. These cells are more stable to environmental conditions due to the large cation sizes which disrupt ionic motion. Organic moieties are also present in the cell, resulting in hydrophobicity. However, 2D perovskite cells have shown inferior optoelectrical properties such as wider bandgaps and larger exciton binding energy. These factors reduce the overall efficiency. As a result, researchers are looking to strike a balance between the improved efficiency of 3D cells and improved stability of 2D cells by mixing 2D perovskite cells with traditional 3D perovskite cells.

An example of such compound is a RP structure of phenylethylammonium(PEA) and methylammonium(MA) cations. The composition of this compound first fabricated by Karunadasa et al. is (PEA)2(MA)2[Pb3I10]. In its crystal structure, the 3D perovskite layers are separated by the PEA chains such that a layered structure is formed. The researchers displayed a decent power conversion efficiency of 4.57% and improved environmental stability. To follow up on this research, Quan et al. investigated the stability of said compound and concluded that the intercalation of PEA molecules between the perovskite layers introduced Van-Der-Waals interactions which increase the formation energy of the 3D perovskite, increasing its stability.

Other research 
Solar cells based on transition metal oxide perovskites and heterostructures thereof such as LaVO3/SrTiO3 have been studied.

Rice University scientists discovered a novel phenomenon of light-induced lattice expansion in perovskite materials.

Perovskite quantum dot solar cell technology may extend cell durability, which remains a critical limitation.

In order to overcome the instability issues with lead-based organic perovskite materials in ambient air and reduce the use of lead, perovskite derivatives, such as Cs2SnI6 double perovskite, have been investigated.

The recombination rate in three-dimensional LHP polycrystalline thin films was decreased significantly by using a hyperbolic metamaterial substrate. The recombination rate of a MAPbI3 LHP thin film was reduced by ~50% and 30% when placed on a plasmonic mirror and a hyperbolic metamaterial, respectively. The recombination rate of (Cs0.06FA0.79MA0.15)Pb(I0.85Br0.15)3 decreased tenfold.

Processing 
Perovskite solar cells hold an advantage over traditional silicon solar cells in the simplicity of their processing and their tolerance to internal defects. Traditional silicon cells require expensive, multi-step processes, conducted at high temperatures (>1000 °C) under high vacuum in special cleanroom facilities. Meanwhile, the hybrid organic-inorganic perovskite material can be manufactured with simpler wet chemistry techniques in a traditional lab environment. Most notably, methylammonium and formamidinium lead trihalides, also known as hybrid perovskites, have been created using a variety of solution deposition techniques, such as spin coating, slot-die coating, blade coating, spray coating, inkjet printing, screen printing, electrodeposition, and vapor deposition techniques, all of which have the potential to be scaled up with relative ease except spin coating.

Deposition methods
The solution-based processing method can be classified into one-step solution deposition and two-step solution deposition. In one-step deposition, a perovskite precursor solution that is prepared by mixing lead halide and organic halide together, is directly deposited through various coating methods, such as spin coating, spraying, blade coating, and slot-die coating, to form perovskite film. One-step deposition is simple, fast, and inexpensive but it's also more challenging to control the perovskite film uniformity and quality. In the two-step deposition, the lead halide film is first deposited then reacts with organic halide to form perovskite film. The reaction takes time to complete but it can be facilitated by adding Lewis-bases or partial organic halide into lead halide precursors. In two-step deposition method, the volume expansion during the conversion of lead halide to perovskite can fill any pinholes to realize a better film quality. The vapor phase deposition processes can be categorized into physical vapor deposition (PVD) and chemical vapor deposition (CVD). PVD refers to the evaporation of a perovskite or its precursor to form a thin perovskite film on the substrate, which is free of solvent. While CVD involves the reaction of organic halide vapor with the lead halide thin film to convert it into the perovskite film. A solution-based CVD, aerosol-assisted CVD (AACVD) was also introduced to fabricate halide perovskite films, such as CH3NH3PbI3, CH3NH3PbBr3, and Cs2SnI6.

One-step solution deposition

In one-step solution processing, a lead halide and a methylammonium halide can be dissolved in a solvent and spin coated onto a substrate. Subsequent evaporation and convective self-assembly during spinning results in dense layers of well crystallized perovskite material, due to the strong ionic interactions within the material (The organic component also contributes to a lower crystallization temperature). However, simple spin-coating does not yield homogenous layers, instead requiring the addition of other chemicals such as GBL, DMSO, and toluene drips. Simple solution processing results in the presence of voids, platelets, and other defects in the layer, which would hinder the efficiency of a solar cell.

Another technique using room temperature solvent-solvent extraction produces high-quality crystalline films with precise control over thickness down to 20 nanometers across areas several centimeters square without generating pinholes. In this method "perovskite precursors are dissolved in a solvent called NMP and coated onto a substrate. Then, instead of heating, the substrate is bathed in diethyl ether, a second solvent that selectively grabs the NMP solvent and whisks it away. What's left is an ultra-smooth film of perovskite crystals."

In another solution processed method, the mixture of lead iodide and methylammonium halide dissolved in DMF is preheated. Then the mixture is spin coated on a substrate maintained at higher temperature. This method produces uniform films of up to 1 mm grain size.

Pb halide perovskites can be fabricated from a PbI2 precursor, or non-PbI2 precursors, such as PbCl2, Pb(Ac)2, and Pb(SCN)2, giving films different properties.

Two-step solution deposition
In 2015, a new approach for forming the PbI2 nanostructure and the use of high CH3NH3I concentration have been adopted to form high quality (large crystal size and smooth) perovskite film with better photovoltaic performances. On one hand, self-assembled porous PbI2 is formed by incorporating small amounts of rationally chosen additives into the PbI2 precursor solutions, which significantly facilitate the conversion of perovskite without any PbI2 residue. On the other hand, through employing a relatively high CH3NH3I concentration, a firmly crystallized and uniform CH3NH3PbI3 film is formed. Furthermore, this is an inexpensive approach.

Vapor deposition
In vapor assisted techniques, spin coated or exfoliated lead halide is annealed in the presence of methylammonium iodide vapor at a temperature of around 150 °C. This technique holds an advantage over solution processing, as it opens up the possibility for multi-stacked thin films over larger areas. This could be applicable for the production of multi-junction cells. Additionally, vapor deposited techniques result in less thickness variation than simple solution processed layers. However, both techniques can result in planar thin film layers or for use in mesoscopic designs, such as coatings on a metal oxide scaffold. Such a design is common for current perovskite or dye-sensitized solar cells.

Scalability
Scalability includes not only scaling up the perovskite absorber layer, but also scaling up charge-transport layers and electrode. Both solution and vapor processes hold promise in terms of scalability. Process cost and complexity is significantly less than that of silicon solar cells. Vapor deposition or vapor assisted techniques reduce the need for use of further solvents, which reduces the risk of solvent remnants. Solution processing is cheaper. Current issues with perovskite solar cells revolve around stability, as the material is observed to degrade in standard environmental conditions, suffering drops in efficiency (See also Stability).

In 2014, Olga Malinkiewicz presented her inkjet printing manufacturing process for perovskite sheets in Boston (US) during the MRS fall meeting – for which she received MIT Technology review's innovators under 35 award. The University of Toronto also claims to have developed a low-cost Inkjet solar cell in which the perovskite raw materials are blended into a Nanosolar ‘ink’ which can be applied by an inkjet printer onto glass, plastic or other substrate materials.

Scaling up the absorber layer
In order to scale up the perovskite layer while maintaining high efficiency, various techniques have been developed to coat the perovskite film more uniformly. For example, promotion of supersaturation through rapid solvent removal increases nucleation density and reduces grain growth time and solute migration. Heating, gas flow, vacuum, and anti-solvent can all assist solvent removal. And chemical additives, such as chloride additives, Lewis base additives, surfactant additive, and surface modification, can influence the crystal growth to control the film morphology. For example, a recent report of surfactant additive, such as L-α-phosphatidylcholine (LP), demonstrated the suppression of solution flow by surfactants to eliminate gaps between islands and meanwhile the surface wetting improvement of perovskite ink on the hydrophobic substrate to ensure a full coverage. Besides, LP can also passivate charge traps to further enhance the device performance, which can be used in blade coating to get a high-throughput of PSCs with minimal efficiency loss.

Scaling up the charge-transport layer
Scaling up the charge-transport layer is also necessary for the scalability of PSCs. Common electron transport layer (ETL) in n-i-p PSCs are TiO2, SnO2 and ZnO. Currently, to make TiO2 layer deposition be compatible with flexible polymer substrate, low-temperature techniques, such as atomic layer deposition, molecular layer deposition, hydrothermal reaction, and electrodeposition, are developed to deposit compact TiO2 layer in large area. Same methods also apply to SnO2 deposition.
As for hole transport layer (HTL), instead of commonly used PEDOT:PSS, NiOx is used as an alternative due to the water absorption of PEDOT, which can be deposited through room-temperature solution processing. CuSCN and NiO are alternative HTL materials which can be deposited by spray coating, blade coating, and electrodeposition, which are potentially scalable. Researchers also report a molecular doping method for scalable blading to make HTL-free PSCs.

Scaling up the back electrode
Evaporation deposition of back electrode is mature and scalable but it requires vacuum. Vacuum-free deposition of back electrode is important for full solution processibility of PSCs. Silver electrodes can be screen-printed, and silver nanowire network can be spray-coated as back electrode. Carbon is also a potential candidate as scalable PSCs electrode, such as graphite, carbon nanotubes, and graphene.

Toxicity 
Toxicity issues associated with the lead content in perovskite solar cells strains the public perception and acceptance of the technology. The health and environmental impact of toxic heavy metals has been much debated in the case of CdTe solar cells, whose efficiency became industrially relevant in the 1990s. CdTe is a thermally and chemically very stable compound with a low solubility product, Ksp, of 10−34 and, accordingly, its toxicity is low. Nevertheless, rigorous industrial hygiene and recycling programs have been implemented. In contrast to CdTe, hybrid perovskites are very unstable and easily degrade to rather soluble compounds of Pb or Sn with KSP=4.4×10−9, which significantly increases their potential bioavailability and hazard for human health, as confirmed by recent toxicological studies. Although the 50% lethal dose of lead [LD50(Pb)] is less than 5 mg per kg of body weight, health issues arise at much lower exposure levels. Young children absorb 4–5 times as much lead as adults and are most susceptible to the adverse effects of lead. In 2003, a maximum blood Pb level (BLL) of 5 μg/dL was imposed by the World Health Organization, which corresponds to the amount of Pb contained in only 25 mm2 of the perovskite solar module. Furthermore, the BLL of 5 μg/dL was revoked in 2010 after the discovery of decreased intelligence and behavioral difficulties in children exposed to even lower values. Recently, Hong Zhang et al. reported a universal co-solvent dilution strategy to significantly reduce the toxic lead waste production, the usage of perovskite materials as well as the fabrication cost by 70%, which also delivers PCEs of over 24% and 18.45% in laboratory cells and modules, respectively.

Reducing lead toxicity

Replacing lead in perovskites
Various studies have been performed to analyze promising alternatives to lead perovskite for use in PSCs. Good candidates for replacement, which ideally have low toxicity, narrow direct bandgaps, high optical absorption coefficients, high carrier mobility, and good charge transport properties, include tin/germanium-halide perovskites, double perovskites, and bismuth/antimony-halides with perovskite-like structures.

Tin-based perovskite solar cells have a relatively low power conversion efficiency (PCE < 9.6%). This low PCE is in part due to the oxidation of Sn2+ to Sn4+, which will act as a p-type dopant in the structure and result in higher dark carrier concentration and increased carrier recombination rates. Germanium halide perovskites have proven similarly unsuccessful due to low efficiencies and issues with oxidizing tendencies, with one experimental solar cells displaying a PCE of only 0.11%. Higher PCEs have been reported from some germanium tin alloy-based perovskites, however, with an all-inorganic CsSn0.5Ge0.5I3 film having a reported PCE of 7.11%. In addition to this higher efficiency, the germanium tin alloy perovskites also have high photostability.

Apart from the tin and germanium based perovskites, there has also been research on the viability of double-perovskites with the formula of A2M+M3+X6. While these double-perovskites have a favorable bandgap of approximately 2 eV and exhibit good stability, several issues including high electron/hole effective masses and the presence of indirect bandgaps result in lowered carrier mobility and charge transport. Research exploring the viability of bismuth/antimony halides in replacing lead perovskites has also been done, particularly with Cs3Sb2I9 and Cs3Bi2I9, which also have bandgaps of approximately 2 eV. Experimental results have also shown that, while antimony and bismuth halide-based PSCs have good stability, their low carrier mobilities and poor charge transport properties restrict their viability in replacing lead-based perovskites.

Encapsulation to reduce lead leakage
Recent research into the usage of encapsulation as a method for reducing lead leakage has been conducted, particularly focusing on the utilization of self-healing polymers. Research has been done on two promising polymers, Surlyn and a thermal crosslinking epoxy-resin, diglycidyl ether bisphenol A:n-octylamine:m-xylylenediamine = 4:2:1. Experiments showed a substantial reduction in lead leakage from PSCs using these self-healing polymers under simulated sunny weather conditions and after simulated hail damage had cracked the outer glass encapsulation. Notably, the epoxy-resin encapsulation was able to reduce lead leakage by a factor of 375 times when heated by simulated sunlight.

Coatings to adsorb lead leakage
Chemically lead-binding coatings have also been employed experimentally to reduce lead leakage from PSCs. In particular, cation exchange resins (CERs) and P,P′-di(2-ethylhexyl)methanediphosphonic acid (DMDP) have been employed experimentally in this effort. Both coatings work similarly, chemically sequestering lead that might leak from a PSC module after weather damage occurs. Research into CERs has shown that, through diffusion-controlled processes, Pb2+ lead is effectively adsorbed and bonded onto the surface of CERs, even in the presence of competing divalent ions such as Mg2+ and Ca2+ that might also occupy binding sites on the CER surface.

To test the efficacy of CER-based coatings in adsorbing lead in practical conditions, researchers dripped slightly acidic water, meant to simulate rainwater, onto a PSC module cracked by simulated hail damage. Researchers found that by applying a CER coating onto the copper electrodes of damaged PSC modules, lead leakage was reduced by 84%. When the CER was integrated into a carbon-based electrode paste applied to PSC and on the top of the encapsulating glass, the lead leakage decreased by 98%. A similar test was also performed on a PSC module with DMDP coated on both the top and bottom of the module to study the efficacy of DMDP in reducing lead leakage. In this test, the module was cracked by simulated hail damage, and placed in a solution of acidic water containing aqueous Ca2+ ions, meant to simulate acidic rain with low levels of aqueous Calcium present. The lead concentration of acidic water was tracked, and researchers found that the lead sequestration efficiency of the DMDP coating at room temperature 96.1%.

Reducing the usage of lead materials during device fabrication 
A co-solvent dilution strategy has been reported to obtain high-quality perovskite films with very low concentration precursor solutions. This strategy substantially reduces the quantity of expensive raw materials in the perovskite precursor ink and reduces the toxic waste production by spin coating through two key routes: minimizing precursor loss during the processing of perovskite films and enhancing the lifetime and shelf-life of the inks by suppressing aggregation of precursor colloids. A PCE of over 24% for laboratory PSCs could be achieved with a co-solvent dilution to a level as low as 0.5 M. In addition, scalability of the co-solvent dilution strategy is tested via fabrication of perovskite solar modules (PSMs) with different sizes using industrial spin coating. The modules fabricated by co-solvent dilution strategy show higher PCEs and far better uniformity and reproducibility than modules prepared with conventional perovskite inks, whilst using a fraction of the precursor. Importantly, more than 70% toxic waste/solvent, perovskite raw material, and fabrication cost are projected to be reduced for module fabrication compared to the same modules made using conventional inks by industrial spin coating, and in doing so make spin coating a sustainable technique for medium scale manufacturing, for instance, for standalone modules or Si wafer-scale integration. This work shows that through judicious selection of a greener co-solvent, we can significantly reduce the usage and waste of toxic solvents and perovskite raw materials, while also simplifying fabrication and cutting costs of PSCs.

Physics 
An important characteristic of the most commonly used perovskite system, the methylammonium lead halides, is a bandgap controllable by the halide content.
The materials also display a diffusion length for both holes and electrons of over one micron.
The long diffusion length means that these materials can function effectively in a thin-film architecture, and that charges can be transported in the perovskite itself over long distances.
It has recently been reported that charges in the perovskite material are predominantly present as free electrons and holes, rather than as bound excitons, since the exciton binding energy is low enough to enable charge separation at room temperature.

Efficiency limits 
Perovskite solar cell bandgaps are tunable and can be optimized for the solar spectrum by altering the halide content in the film (i.e., by mixing I and Br). The Shockley–Queisser limit radiative efficiency limit, also known as the detailed balance limit, is about 31% under an AM1.5G solar spectrum at 1000 W/m, for a Perovskite bandgap of 1.55 eV. This is slightly smaller than the radiative limit of gallium arsenide of bandgap 1.42 eV which can reach a radiative efficiency of 33%.

Values of the detailed balance limit are available in tabulated form and a MATLAB program for implementing the detailed balance model has been written.

In the meantime, the drift-diffusion model has found to successfully predict the efficiency limit of perovskite solar cells, which enable us to understand the device physics in-depth, especially the radiative recombination limit and selective contact on device performance. There are two prerequisites for predicting and approaching the perovskite efficiency limit. First, the intrinsic radiative recombination needs to be corrected after adopting optical designs which will significantly affect the open-circuit voltage at its Shockley–Queisser limit. Second, the contact characteristics of the electrodes need to be carefully engineered to eliminate the charge accumulation and surface recombination at the electrodes. With the two procedures, the accurate prediction of efficiency limit and precise evaluation of efficiency degradation for perovskite solar cells are attainable by the drift-diffusion model.

Along with analytical calculations, there have been many first principle studies to find the characteristics of the perovskite material numerically. These include but are not limited to bandgap, effective mass, and defect levels for different perovskite materials. Also there have some efforts to cast light on the device mechanism based on simulations where Agrawal et al. suggests a modeling framework, presents analysis of near ideal efficiency, and  talks about the importance of interface of perovskite and hole/electron transport layers. However, Sun et al. tries to come up with a compact model for perovskite different structures based on experimental transport data.

Architectures 

Perovskite solar cells function efficiently in a number of somewhat different architectures depending either on the role of the perovskite material in the device, or the nature of the top and bottom electrode. Devices in which positive charges are extracted by the transparent bottom electrode (cathode), can predominantly be divided into 'sensitized', where the perovskite functions mainly as a light absorber, and charge transport occurs in other materials, or 'thin-film', where most electron or hole transport occurs in the bulk of the perovskite itself. Similar to the sensitization in dye-sensitized solar cells, the perovskite material is coated onto a charge-conducting mesoporous scaffold – most commonly TiO2 – as light-absorber. The photogenerated electrons are transferred from the perovskite layer to the mesoporous sensitized layer through which they are transported to the electrode and extracted into the circuit. The thin film solar cell architecture is based on the finding that perovskite materials can also act as highly efficient, ambipolar charge-conductor.

After light absorption and the subsequent charge-generation, both negative and positive charge carrier are transported through the perovskite to charge selective contacts. Perovskite solar cells emerged from the field of dye-sensitized solar cells, so the sensitized architecture was that initially used, but over time it has become apparent that they function well, if not ultimately better, in a thin-film architecture. More recently, some researchers also successfully demonstrated the possibility of fabricating flexible devices with perovskites, which makes it more promising for flexible energy demand. Certainly, the aspect of UV-induced degradation in the sensitized architecture may be detrimental for the important aspect of long-term stability.

There is another different class of architectures, in which the transparent electrode at the bottom acts as cathode by collecting the photogenerated p-type charge carriers.

Research and development tools and methods

The Perovskite Database is a database and analysis tool of perovskite solar cells research data which systematically integrates over 15,000 publications, in particular device-data about "over 42,400" perovskite devices. Authors described the FAIR open database site – which as of January 2022 requires signing up to access the data and uses software that is partly open source but not marked as having a free software license on GitHub – as a participative "Wikipedia for perovskite solar cell research". It allows data to be filtered and displayed according to various criteria such as material compositions or component type and could thereby support the development of optimal architecture designs (including the used materials).

High-throughput screening of mixtures and contact layers is one development mechanism that has been used to develop relatively stable perovskite solar cells.

History 

Perovskite materials have been well known for many years, but the first incorporation into a solar cell was reported by Tsutomu Miyasaka et al. in 2009.
This was based on a dye-sensitized solar cell architecture, and generated only 3.8% power conversion efficiency (PCE) with a thin layer of perovskite on mesoporous TiO2 as electron-collector. Moreover, because a liquid corrosive electrolyte was used, the cell was only stable for a few minutes. Nam-Gyu Park et al. improved upon this in 2011, using the same dye-sensitized concept, achieving 6.5% PCE.

A breakthrough came in 2012, when Mike Lee and Henry Snaith from the University of Oxford realized that the perovskite was stable if contacted with a solid-state hole transporter such as spiro-OMeTAD and did not require the mesoporous TiO2 layer in order to transport electrons.
They showed that efficiencies of almost 10% were achievable using the 'sensitized' TiO2 architecture with the solid-state hole transporter, but higher efficiencies, above 10%, were attained by replacing it with an inert scaffold.
Further experiments in replacing the mesoporous TiO2 with Al2O3 resulted in increased open-circuit voltage and a relative improvement in efficiency of 3–5% more than those with TiO2 scaffolds.
This led to the hypothesis that a scaffold is not needed for electron extraction, which was later proved correct. This realization was then closely followed by a demonstration that the perovskite itself could also transport holes, as well as electrons.
A thin-film perovskite solar cell, with no mesoporous scaffold, of > 10% efficiency was achieved.

In 2013 both the planar and sensitized architectures saw a number of developments.
Burschka et al. demonstrated a deposition technique for the sensitized architecture exceeding 15% efficiency by a two-step solution processing, At a similar time Olga Malinkiewicz et al., and Liu et al. showed that it was possible to fabricate planar solar cells by thermal co-evaporation, achieving more than 12% and 15% efficiency in a p-i-n and an n-i-p architecture respectively.
Docampo et al. also showed that it was possible to fabricate perovskite solar cells in the typical 'organic solar cell' architecture, an 'inverted' configuration with the hole transporter below and the electron collector above the perovskite planar film.

A range of new deposition techniques and even higher efficiencies were reported in 2014. A reverse-scan efficiency of 19.3% was claimed at UCLA using the planar thin-film architecture. In November 2014, a device by researchers from KRICT achieved a record with the certification of a non-stabilized efficiency of 20.1%.

Continuing the trend, a new record of efficiency for a single-junction perovskite solar cell efficiency was set each year since 2015, with the most frequent record-breakers coming from KRICT and UNIST. The latest record-holders are researchers from UNIST who achieved 25.7% efficiency. 

At least since 2016, the records for perovskite-silicon tandem solar cells have consistently remained higher than the ones for single-junction cells. Since 2018 the records were interchangeably broken by Oxford Photovoltaics and researchers from Helmholtz-Zentrum Berlin. In 2022, the latter achieved the best efficiency so far: 32.5%.

Stability 

One big challenge for perovskite solar cells (PSCs) is the aspect of short-term and long-term stability. The traditional silicon-wafer solar cell in a power plant can last 20–25 years, setting that timeframe as the standard for solar cell stability. PSCs have great difficulty lasting that long [196]. The instability of PSCs is mainly related to environmental influence (moisture and oxygen), thermal stress and intrinsic stability of methylammonium-based perovskite, and formamidinium-based perovskite, heating under applied voltage, photo influence (ultraviolet light) (visible light) and mechanical fragility. Several studies about PSCs stability have been performed and some elements have been proven to be important to the PSCs stability. However, there is no standard "operational" stability protocol for PSCs. But a method to quantify the intrinsic chemical stability of hybrid halide perovskites has been recently proposed.

The water-solubility of the organic constituent of the absorber material make devices highly prone to rapid degradation in moist environments. The degradation which is caused by moisture can be reduced by optimizing the constituent materials, the architecture of the cell, the interfaces and the environment conditions during the fabrication steps. Encapsulating the perovskite absorber with a composite of carbon nanotubes and an inert polymer matrix can prevent the immediate degradation of the material by moist air at elevated temperatures. However, no long-term studies and comprehensive encapsulation techniques have yet been demonstrated for perovskite solar cells. Devices with a mesoporous TiO2 layer sensitized with the perovskite absorber, are also UV-unstable, due to the interaction between photogenerated holes inside the TiO2 and oxygen radicals on the surface of TiO2.

The measured ultra low thermal conductivity of 0.5 W/(Km) at room temperature in CH3NH3PbI3 can prevent fast propagation of the light deposited heat, and keep the cell resistive on thermal stresses that can reduce its life time. The PbI2 residue in perovskite film has been experimentally demonstrated to have a negative effect on the long-term stability of devices. The stabilization problem is claimed to be solved by replacing the organic transport layer with a metal oxide layer, allowing the cell to retain 90% capacity after 60 days. Besides, the two instabilities issues can be solved by using multifunctional fluorinated photopolymer coatings that confer luminescent and easy-cleaning features on the front side of the devices, while concurrently forming a strongly hydrophobic barrier toward environmental moisture on the back contact side. The front coating can prevent the UV light of the whole incident solar spectrum from negatively interacting with the PSC stack by converting it into visible light, and the back layer can prevent water from permeation within the solar cell stack. The resulting devices demonstrated excellent stability in terms of power conversion efficiencies during a 180-day aging test in the lab and a real outdoor condition test for more than 3 months.

In July 2015, major hurdles were that the largest perovskite solar cell was only the size of a fingernail and that they degraded quickly in moist environments. However, researchers from EPFL published in June 2017, a work successfully demonstrating large scale perovskite solar modules with no observed degradation over one year (short circuit conditions). Now, together with other organizations, the research team aims to develop a fully printable perovskite solar cell with 22% efficiency and with 90% of performance after ageing tests.

In 2017, Henry Snaith et al. achieved an efficiency of 17.5% ± 1.3% 2D-3D heterostructure butylammonium-caesium-formamidinium lead halide perovskite which can maintain 80% of its efficiency after 1000 hours in air and 4000 hours when encapsulated. The 2D Ruddlesden-Popper layers in the structure of BAx(FA0.83Cs0.17)1-xPb(I0.6Br0.4)3 2D-3D structure can increase crystallinity of perovskite and thus reduce defects which are responsible for non-radiative recombination. Later in 2021, Yang et al published on phenylformamidinium-enabled 2D Ruddlesden-Popper perovskite with improved stability. They achieved efficiency of 14.78% using 4-chloro-phenylformamidinium (CPFA) as spacer cation in 2D CPFA2MAn-1Pbn(I0.857Cl0.143)3n+1vperovskite film, which can maintain 80% of its efficiency over 2000 hours of storage under ambient condition, compared to 3D MAPbI3, which can only sustain 45% of efficiency. It is believed that the Ruddlesden-Popper perovskite can have better stability as a solar cells used as solar cells, but with lower power conversion efficiency. 

Early in 2019, the longest stability test reported to date showed a steady power output during at least 4000 h of continuous operation at Maximum power point tracking (MPPT) under 1 sun illumination from a xenon lamp based solar simulator without UV light filtering. Remarkably, the light harvester used during the stability test is classical methylammonium (MA) based perovskite, MAPbI3, but devices are built up with neither organic based selective layer nor metal back contact. Under these conditions, only thermal stress was found to be the major factor contributing to the loss of operational stability in encapsulated devices.

The intrinsic fragility of the perovskite material requires extrinsic reinforcement to shield this crucial layer from mechanical stresses. Insertion of mechanically reinforcing scaffolds directly into the active layers of perovskite solar cells resulted in the compound solar cell formed exhibiting a 30-fold increase in fracture resistance, repositioning the fracture properties of perovskite solar cells into the same domain as conventional c-Si, CIGS and CdTe solar cells. Several approaches have been developed to improve perovskite solar cell stability. For instance, 
in 2021 researchers reported that the stability and long-term reliability of perovskite solar cells was improved with a new kind of "molecular glue".

As of 2021, the existing stability tests for solar panels and solar cell systems are designed solely for those containing silicon wafers. As such, these tests, produced by the International Electrotechnical Commission (IEC), have been re-evaluated for their lack of suitability. At the International Summit on Organic PV Stability (ISOS), stability checks for in-lab development of all solar cells were created, but these were not adopted by the IEC. These tests are not pass/fail criteria, rather they evaluate the various causes of solar cell stability issues to root out the problems. They are grouped into five categories: dark storage testing, outdoor testing, light soaking testing, thermal cycling testing, and light-humidity-thermal cycling testing. In these tests, the PCE and J-V data graphs of the PSCs were calculated among varying physical conditions to determine the various causes of PSC degradation.

Overall, these ISOS tests helped determine the causes of PSC degradation, which were found to include extended exposure to visible and UV light, environmental contamination, high temperatures, and electrical biases. After 200 temperature cycles, the 2020 PSCs still retained 90% of their power, indicating that they are capable of short-term stability. Now, what remains to be researched is long-term stability, and what material advances could be applied to boost these 200 temperature cycles (days) to 20–25 years.

Recycling 

Another core problem in the development, production and use of perovskite solar cells is their recyclability. Perovskite recycling is an absolute necessity due to the presence of lead in perovskites. The use of this element means that simply disposing of perovskite solar cells into landfills would be a major health hazard due to lead runoff and toxicity to both bodies of water and human health [195]. Designs and processes or protocols for efficient recycling would reduce negative environmental impacts, exploitation of critical materials, health impacts and energy requirements beyond what can be achieved with increases in device lifetime. In a review, scientists concluded that "recycle and recovery technologies of perovskite solar cells should be researched and developed proactively". Some aspects of recyclability and recycling-rates depend on the design of the disseminated products. Scientific research and development may not get facilitated to design for recyclability – instead most scientists mainly "look at performance" – "energy conversion efficiency and stability" and often "neglect designing for recycling".

In 2021, many solar cells implemented in the year 2000 are nearing their end-of-life stage. As such, research into perovskite recycling is crucial. One tricky component of perovskites to recycle is lead. Currently, producing 1 GW of energy using the most efficient perovskite solar cell would result in 3.5 tons of lead waste. The main strategy used right now to mitigate lead contamination is in-operation of the solar cell. Lead absorbing P,P’-di(2-ethylhexyl)methanediphosphonic acid and sulfonic acid cation-exchange resin are used to prevent lead leaking from any damages the solar panels may incur during use 195.

Research is ongoing to discover means to reduce lead's impact beyond simply lead leakage prevention. Carboxylic acid cation-exchange resin has been found to adsorb lead ions via ion-exchange with hydrogen, and these ions can be easily released via recrystallization from adding sodium iodide to the aqueous solution. This process was found to be low-cost compared to other existing lead recycling techniques, and could theoretically be implemented commercially.

Recently, since the efficiency of the best perovskite solar-cell reached 25.5%, comparable to the best PV cells made of single-crystal silicon, it is optimistic for the perovskite PV cells to be commercial in the future. Therefore, the recycling of the lead and transparent conductors are essential for the development of perovskite PV cells since the former reduces harmful environmental impact and the latter reduces costs. The organic solvent such as dimethylformamide (DMF) is used in the research to dissolve Pb and separate ITO/glass, then the carboxylic acid cation-exchange resin, in this research WAC-gel is used because of best performance, is utilized to absorb Pb ions in the DMF and release it in a form of Pb(NO3)2. By adding NaI into the solution, PbI2 can precipitate and be recycled. The recycled materials properties are analyzed in that both PbI2 and ITO/glass have the same performance as the new ones do, and the recycling efficiency reached 99.2%. Moreover, the cost analysis shows that solar modules based on recycling cost around $12 per square meter, whereas those based on new materials cost around $24.8 per square meter. Therefore, it is beneficial to recycle the perovskite PV cells from both environmental and economical perspectives.

Hysteretic current-voltage behavior 
Another major challenge for perovskite solar cells is the observation that current-voltage scans yield ambiguous efficiency values.
The power conversion efficiency of a solar cell is usually determined by characterizing its current-voltage (IV) behavior under simulated solar illumination. In contrast to other solar cells, however, it has been observed that the IV-curves of perovskite solar cells show a hysteretic behavior: depending on scanning conditions – such as scan direction, scan speed, light soaking, biasing – there is a discrepancy between the scan from forward-bias to short-circuit (FB-SC) and the scan from short-circuit to forward bias (SC-FB). Various causes have been proposed such as ion movement, polarization, ferroelectric effects, filling of trap states, however, the exact origin for the hysteretic behavior is yet to be determined. But it appears that determining the solar cell efficiency from IV-curves risks producing inflated values if the scanning parameters exceed the time-scale which the perovskite system requires in order to reach an electronic steady-state. Two possible solutions have been proposed: Unger et al. show that extremely slow voltage-scans allow the system to settle into steady-state conditions at every measurement point which thus eliminates any discrepancy between the FB-SC and the SC-FB scan.

Henry Snaith et al. have proposed 'stabilized power output' as a metric for the efficiency of a solar cell. This value is determined by holding the tested device at a constant voltage around the maximum power-point (where the product of voltage and photocurrent reaches its maximum value) and track the power-output until it reaches a constant value.
Both methods have been demonstrated to yield lower efficiency values when compared to efficiencies determined by fast IV-scans. However, initial studies have been published that show that surface passivation of the perovskite absorber is an avenue with which efficiency values can be stabilized very close to fast-scan efficiencies.
No obvious hysteresis of photocurrent was observed by changing the sweep rates or the direction in devices or the sweep rates. This indicates that the origin of hysteresis in photocurrent is more likely due to the trap formation in some non optimized films and device fabrication processes. The ultimate way to examine the efficiency of a solar cell device is to measure its power output at the load point. If there is large density of traps in the devices or photocurrent hysteresis for other reasons, the photocurrent would rise slowly upon turning on illumination This suggests that the interfaces might play a crucial role with regards to the hysteretic IV behavior since the major difference of the inverted architecture to the regular architectures is that an organic n-type contact is used instead of a metal oxide.

The observation of hysteretic current-voltage characteristics has thus far been largely underreported. Only a small fraction of publications acknowledge the hysteretic behavior of the described devices, even fewer articles show slow non-hysteretic IV curves or stabilized power outputs. Reported efficiencies, based on rapid IV-scans, have to be considered fairly unreliable and make it currently difficult to genuinely assess the progress of the field.

The ambiguity in determining the solar cell efficiency from current-voltage characteristics due to the observed hysteresis has also affected the certification by accredited laboratories such as NREL. The record efficiency of 20.1% for perovskite solar cells accepted as certified value by NREL in November 2014, has been classified as 'not stabilized'. To compare results from different institutions, it is necessary to agree on a measurement protocol.

Perovskites for tandem applications 
A perovskite cell combined with bottom cell such as Si or copper indium gallium selenide (CIGS) as a tandem design can suppress individual cell bottlenecks and take advantage of the complementary characteristics to enhance the efficiency. This type of cells have higher efficiency potential, and therefore attracted recently a large attention from academic researchers.

4-terminal tandems 

Using a four terminal configuration in which the two sub-cells are electrically isolated, Bailie et al. obtained a 17% and 18.6% efficient tandem cell with mc-Si (η ~ 11%) and copper indium gallium selenide (CIGS, η ~ 17%) bottom cells, respectively. A 13.4% efficient tandem cell with a highly efficient a-Si:H/c-Si heterojunction bottom cell using the same configuration was obtained. The application of TCO-based transparent electrodes to perovskite cells allowed to fabricate near-infrared transparent devices with improved efficiency and lower parasitic absorption losses. The application of these cells in 4-terminal tandems allowed improved efficiencies up to 26.7% when using a silicon bottom cell and up to 23.9% with a CIGS bottom cell. In 2020, KAUST-University of Toronto teams reported 28.2% efficient four terminal perovskite/silicon tandems solar cells. To achieve this results, the team used Zr-doped In2O3 transparent electrodes on semitransparent perovskite top cells, which was previously introduced by Aydin et al., and improved the near infrared response of the silicon bottom cells by utilizing broadband transparent H-doped In2O3 electrodes. Also, the team enhanced the electron-diffusion length (up to 2.3 µm) thanks to Lewis base passivation via urea. The record efficiency for perovskite/silicon tandems currently stands at 28.2%

2-terminal tandems

Mailoa et al. started the efficiency race for monolithic 2-terminal tandems using an homojunction c-Si bottom cell and demonstrate a 13.7% cell, largely limited by parasitic absorption losses. Then, Albrecht et al. developed a low-temperature processed perovskite cells using a SnO2 electron transport layer. This allowed the use of silicon heterojunction solar cells as bottom cell and tandem efficiencies up to 18.1%. Werner et al. then improved this performance replacing the SnO2 layer with PCBM and introducing a sequential hybrid deposition method for the perovskite absorber, leading to a tandem cell with 21.2% efficiency. Important parasitic absorption losses due to the use of Spiro-OMeTAD were still limiting the overall performance. An important change was demonstrated by Bush et al., who inverted the polarity of the top cell (n-i-p to p-i-n). They used a bilayer of SnO2 and zinc tin oxide (ZTO) processed by ALD to work as a sputtering buffer layer, which enables the following deposition of a transparent top indium tin oxide (ITO) electrode. This change helped to improve the environmental and thermal stability of the perovskite cell and was crucial to further improve the perovskite/silicon tandem performance to 23.6%.

In the continuity, using a p-i-n perovskite top cell, Sahli et al. demonstrated in June 2018 a fully textured monolithic tandem cell with 25.2% efficiency, independently certified by Fraunhofer ISE CalLab. This improved efficiency can largely be attributed to the massively reduced reflection losses (below 2% in the range 360 nm-1000 nm, excluding metallization) and reduced parasitic absorption losses, leading to certified short-circuit currents of 19.5 mA/cm2. Also in June 2018 the company Oxford Photovoltaics presented a cell with 27.3% efficiency. In March 2020, KAUST-University of Toronto teams reported tandem devices with spin-cast perovskite films on fully textured bottom cells with 25.7%. In the present, the research teams show effort to utilize more solution-based scalable techniques on textured bottom cells. Accordingly, blade-coated perovskite based tandems were reported by a collaborative team of University of North Carolina and Arizona State University. Following this, in August 2020 KAUST team demonstrated first slot-die coated perovskite based tandems, which was important step for accelerated processing of tandems. In September 2020, Aydin et al. showed the highest certified short-circuit currents of 19.8 mA/cm2 on fully textured silicon bottom cells. Also, Aydin et al. showed the first outdoor performance results for perovskite/silicon tandem solar cells, which was an important hurdle for the reliability tests of such devices. In December 2021, KAUST team updated the champion PCE to 28.2% (certified). 
The record efficiency for perovskite/silicon tandems currently stands at 29.8% as of December 2021.

Theoretical modeling 

There have been some efforts to predict the theoretical limits for these traditional tandem designs using a perovskite cell as top cell on a c-Si or a-Si/c-Si heterojunction bottom cell. To show that the output power can be even further enhanced, bifacial structures were studied as well. It was concluded that extra output power can be extracted from the bifacial structure as compared to a bifacial HIT cell when the albedo reflection takes on values between 10 and 40%, which are realistic.
It has been pointed out that the so-called impact ionization process can take place in strongly correlated insulators such as some oxide perovskites, which can lead to 
multiple carrier generation. Also, Aydin et al. revealed that, the temperature should be considered while calculating the theoretical limits since these devices reaches the temperature of almost 60 °C under real operations. This case is special to perovskite/silicon tandems since the temperature dependence of both the silicon and perovskite bandgaps—which follow opposing trends—shifts the devices away from current matching for two-terminal tandems that are optimized at standard test conditions.

The use of effective light-trapping schemes can allow pronounced optical improvements, particularly when applied in all-thin-film tandems. For instance, with ~2 um thick perovskite-on-silicon double-junctions, the integration of optimized photonic structures can provide up to 25% photocurrent gain, thereby enabling close to 29% tandem efficiency even with such thin devices.

Up-scaling 

In May 2016, IMEC and its partner Solliance announced a tandem structure with a semi-transparent perovskite cell stacked on top of a back-contacted silicon cell. A combined power conversion efficiency of 20.2% was claimed, with the potential to exceed 30%.

All-perovskite tandems 

In 2016, the development of efficient low-bandgap (1.2 - 1.3eV) perovskite materials and the fabrication of efficient devices based on these enabled a new concept: all-perovskite tandem solar cells, where two perovskite compounds with different bandgaps are stacked on top of each other. The first two- and four-terminal devices with this architecture reported in the literature achieved efficiencies of 17% and 20.3%. In addition, making formamidinium caesium lead iodide bromide perovskite into four-terminal tandem cells could achieve efficiency ranging from 19.8% to 25.2%, depending on the parameters of the measurements. All-perovskite tandem cells offer the prospect of being the first fully solution-processable architecture that has a clear route to exceeding not only the efficiencies of silicon, but also GaAs and other expensive III-V semiconductor solar cells.

In 2017, Dewei Zhao et al. fabricated low-bandgap (~1.25 eV) mixed Sn-Pb perovskite solar cells (PVSCs) with a thickness of 620 nm. This resulted in larg grains, high crystallinity, long carrier lifetime (>250 ns), and a PCE of 17.6%. Furthermore, this low-bandgap PVSC reached an external quantum efficiency (EQE) of more than 70% in the wavelength range of 700–900 nm, the essential infrared spectral region where sunlight transmitted to bottom cell. They also combined the bottom cell with a ~1.58 eV bandgap perovskite top cell to create an all-perovskite tandem solar cell with four terminals, obtaining a steady-state PCE of 21.0%, suggesting the possibility of fabricating high-efficiency all-perovskite tandem solar cells.

A study in 2020 shows that all-perovskite tandems have much lower carbon footprints than silicon-perovskite tandems.

In 2020, all-perovskite tandem efficiencies hit a new peak of 24.2% efficiency for 1 cm² solar cells. This value was measured and recorded by Japan Electrical Safety and Environment Technology Laboratories, and was reached by passivating defects at grain boundaries of the traditional lead-tin perovskite using zwitterionic molecules. They inhibit tin ion oxidation, a process which lowers the efficiency of the solar cell by increasing trap density and preventing diffusion. The introduction of zwitterionic antioxidants greatly boosts the efficiency of these devices while only permitting an additional 2% degradation. The addition of zwitterionic substances also requires using an environment rich with formamidine sulfinic acid, catalyzing the necessary reactions to permit charge to transport between the solar cells.

In November 2022, the all-perovskite tandem efficiency reached a new record of 27.4%. This breaks the 2020 record for 1 cm2 solar cells, and was achieved by a joint team from Northwestern University, University of Toronto, and the University of Toledo. This cell additionally broke the previous record for Voc for all-perovskite tandems, and was certified by NREL with a PCE of 26.3% and a VOC of 2.13V. This marks the “first certified all-perovskite tandem to surpass the record PCE (25.7%) of single-junction perovskite solar cells”. Chen et al. have found areas for improvement in the JSC values that put 30% efficiency in the near future.

Modeling 
To investigate possible all-tandem perovskite candidates in an efficient and economical way, simulation software has been implemented. Shankar et al. published a paper in 2022 detailing their use of the Solar Cell Capacitance Simulator – One Dimensional software. This software allows the user to vary device parameters and properties to optimize performance. Results from this simulation research have exhibited efficiencies as high as 30% for a band gap of 1.4 eV, which resulted from increasing the external quantum efficiency to 95% via doping the transport layer. Shankar et al simulated an efficiency of 32.3% by altering the material and thickness of the electron transport and hole transport layers. This simulated efficiency represents a 37% increase in simulated work so far and was obtained upon optimization of work done by Zhao et al. in two-terminal all-perovskite tandem solar cells.

Commercialization 

The first factory producing perovskite solar cells was opened in May 2021 in Wrocław by Saule Technologies.  there is a little manufacturing in Poland and China, but large-scale deployment is held back by the instability and shorter lifespan. However companies hope to have perovskite-on-silicon tandem products on the market with a 25-year warranty sometime in the mid-2020s. They may help to meet the high targets for new solar power in India. Building-integrated photovoltaics is a possible area of commercialization, and while there are still stability-related concerns, in 2021 a building in Lublin became the first to be clad with perovskite solar panels, which marked the first commercial use of perovskite.

The U.S. Department of Energy Solar Energy Technologies Office (SETO) is a government organization that is investing in the research and development of perovskite solar technologies. They have identified several key areas of improvement if perovskite solar cells are to play a part in the future of photovoltaic technologies.

The four target areas for improvement are Stability and Durability, Power Conversion Efficiency at Scale, Manufacturability, and Technology Validation and Bankability. The first and third points are addressed above in the Processing and Scalability sections.

Laboratory efficiencies for small-area devices have not been reproduced for larger scale devices yet. Hence, although small-scale devices may find use in mobile and disaster response technologies owing to their light weight, flexibility, and high power-to-weight ratios, large-scale testing will be necessary before the power industry adopts this technology on the grid-level.

See also 

 Dye-sensitized solar cell
 Emerging photovoltaics
 Hybrid solar cell
 List of types of solar cells
 Methylammonium lead halide
 Nanocrystal solar cell
 Perovskite (mineral)
 Polymer solar cell
 Thin film solar cell
 Third generation photovoltaic cell

References

Further reading

Solar cells
Thin-film cells
Dye-sensitized solar cells
Perovskites